Giulio Maggiore (born 12 March 1998) is an Italian professional footballer who plays as a midfielder for  club Salernitana.

Club career
Maggiore made his professional debut in the Serie B for Spezia on 20 September 2016 in a game against Trapani.

After helping Spezia achieve promotion in the 2019–20 Serie B season, Maggiore made his Serie A debut in a 4–1 debut against Sassuolo on 27 September 2020. At the end of the season, after the team had survived in their first top-flight season and the departure of Claudio Terzi, Maggiore was promoted to the status of club captain.

On 16 August 2022, Maggiore moved to Salernitana on a four-year contract.

International career
Maggiore was included in the Italy under-21 squad for the 2021 UEFA European Under-21 Championship.

Career statistics

References

External links
 

Living people
1998 births
Footballers from Genoa
Italian footballers
Italy under-21 international footballers
Italy youth international footballers
Association football midfielders
Spezia Calcio players
U.S. Salernitana 1919 players
Serie A players
Serie B players